Nattland (also written "Natland") is a neighbourhood in Årstad and Fana boroughs in the city of Bergen in Vestland county, Norway. It is located south of Landås and northeast of Paradis, although, like every neighbourhood outside Bergenhus borough, it has no clearly defined borders. The basic statistical units of Nattlandsfjellet, Øvre Nattland, and Nedre Nattland had a combined population of 3121 as of 1 January 2009. Nattland is the location of Nattland Studentboliger, a major student housing complex for students with children.

References

Neighbourhoods of Bergen